Othniel Looker House is a historic house located at 10580 Marvin Road in Harrison, Ohio. Othniel Looker was briefly the fifth Governor of Ohio.

Description and history

Harrison was settled in the early 1800s. Most who came were veterans of the Revolutionary War who had received land grants for their service. Among them was Othniel Looker who bought this property and with his two eldest sons cleared the land and erected the wood house. The remainder of his family then followed. The family lived in the home until the death of Looker's wife.

The house is a two-story wood frame building with a shake gable roof. The main facade is symmetrical with two doors and three windows alternating. The three central bays are subtly grouped with the end windows slightly set outward. The second floor has the same five bay pattern and grouping, each bay containing a six over six double hung sash window. The lower story windows are the same. The paneled doors are topped by matched four light transoms. The rear of the building has two batten doors and four windows. The windows are the same design as the front by the placement is asymmetric and irregular. Both gable ends have interior chimneys. The four room interior retains original features including hand scraped chair rails, baseboards and molding.

The Looker House, significant as symbol of an import part of Ohio history, is one of the oldest extant structures in the Harrison area. It was originally located in a south facing position on Harrison Pike. The building was scheduled for demolition in 1962 when the Village Historical Society had the building completely dismantled, moved to its current location and reassembled under architectural supervision. The move did not alter the building in any significant way. It was listed in the National Register on June 5, 1975. The Othniel Looker House has been restored to a historically appropriate state and the society currently operates the facility as a museum.

See also
 History of Ohio
 National Register of Historic Places listings in Hamilton County, Ohio

References

External links
 
  - video about the home and its move
  - historical resources online and at repository

Houses on the National Register of Historic Places in Ohio
Houses in Hamilton County, Ohio
National Register of Historic Places in Hamilton County, Ohio